Bessie I. Murray was an American Republican politician from Northborough, Massachusetts. She represented the 11th Worcester district in the Massachusetts House of Representatives from 1957 to 1958.

See also
1957-1958 Massachusetts legislature

References

Year of birth missing
Year of death missing
Members of the Massachusetts House of Representatives
Women state legislators in Massachusetts
20th-century American women politicians
20th-century American politicians
People from Northborough, Massachusetts